Major General Bambang Darmono was the commander of the Indonesian military presence in Aceh from 2002 to 2005. Accusations of human rights violations have been leveled at his command during this time.

References

External links

Year of birth missing (living people)
Living people
Indonesian generals
Place of birth missing (living people)